"Jungle Love" is a song from The Time's third album, Ice Cream Castle.

Background
"Jungle Love" is a funk-pop track relying mainly on bass, analog synthesizer and drum machines, although there are elements of new wave keyboards and a rock guitar solo, allowing the song to cross musical boundaries. The track was one of the first songs recorded for the album, being cut in late March 1983 during Prince's 1999 tour.

The track was also one of the first Time tracks to involve other members of the band in the creation of the song. Morris Day and Jesse Johnson both contributed to writing the song. Day provided sexual lead vocals and animalistic sound effects, and Johnson played guitar on the recording, while Prince played all the other instruments.

Impact
The song's elements, combined with the Purple Rain momentum, propelled the song to The Time's second-highest position thus far on the pop charts peaking at #20 on the Billboard Hot 100. Their highest-charting song was "Jerk Out" which peaked at #9.

The song is one of the Time's signature numbers and is played at every concert to this day.  It's popular also due to the section where Morris asks Jerome on stage where Jerome holds up a mirror for Morris to check his hair and the duo do a dance on stage. Live versions of the song have been released on two DVDs, including one of the band performing the song on Jay and Silent Bob Strike Back.  A live recording from 1998 was also included on the Morris Day release, It's About Time (released in 2004).

Charts

Legacy
It can be heard in the movies Bringing Down the House and Forgetting Sarah Marshall. It is also featured in the movie Jay and Silent Bob Strike Back, where it is performed by the full band. A cover version can be heard in The Super Mario Bros. Super Show! episode, "Jungle Fever" during the original run.

Prince's original version was released on his posthumous album Originals in 2019.

References

The Time (band) songs
1984 singles
Songs written by Prince (musician)
Song recordings produced by Prince (musician)
1984 songs
Warner Records singles